Tessa Blanchard (born July 26, 1995) is an American professional wrestler. She is best known for her time in Impact Wrestling, where she became the first female wrestler to win the Impact World Championship and is also a former Impact Knockouts Champion. A second-generation professional wrestler, Blanchard is the daughter of Four Horsemen member Tully Blanchard,granddaughter of wrestling promoter Joe Blanchard, and the stepdaughter of Tully Blanchard's rival Magnum T. A. In addition, Blanchard is a former The Crash Women's Champion, AAA Reina de Reinas Champion, and WOW World Champion.

Early life and training
Blanchard was born in Charlotte, North Carolina on July 26, 1995. She is the granddaughter of wrestler Joe Blanchard, daughter of Tully Blanchard and the stepdaughter of Magnum T. A.

At age 4, Blanchard and her siblings moved in with her mother and stepfather after her parents' separation. Tully Blanchard would visit his children at least once a month after the divorce. She has three siblings from her father and twin half-siblings from her stepfather. Blanchard considers herself a musical-theater enthusiast, having enrolled at the Children's Theatre of Charlotte, joining Shakespeare recitation contests, and acting in all of her high school's amateur productions. She was also on the track team.

She left home after high school and briefly attended the University of North Carolina at Charlotte, lived off income from working in a nightclub, and stopped communicating with members of her immediate family for a prolonged stretch.
Blanchard was bartending and waiting tables and partying with her college friends when her interest in wrestling was piqued. She went with her father for the Four Horsemen's 2012 induction into WWE's Hall of Fame in Miami. Tessa kept her wrestling plans unknown from her family as she was then still only slowly reconciling with her mother and stepfather.

Blanchard went to Highspots Wrestling School in Charlotte when she turned 18 in 2013. She was trained by veteran NWA/WWE/WCW enhancement talent George South and had future WWE wrestler Cedric Alexander among her classmates. Blanchard informed her father and stepfather about her wrestling training upon the insistence of South and Highspots owner Michael Bochicchio around six months into her training. She tried out for WWE in 2014 but a formal offer never materialized.

Professional wrestling career

Independent circuit (2014–2016)

Blanchard competed at Queens of Combat 2 on June 13, 2014, where she interrupted a speech by Miss Rachel after her victory over Amanda Rodriguez, which resulted in a match between Blanchard and Miss Rachel, where Blanchard was defeated. On October 11, she participated in the Super 8 ChickFight tournament organized by the East Coast Wrestling Association (ECWA), a federation of Delaware, where women under ECWA compete. Blanchard won the tournament by eliminating successively Tina San Antonio, Renee Michelle, and finally, Jenny Rose. A week later, Blanchard successfully defended her title of women's champion of the ECWA against Amber O'Neal.

On November 8, 2014, Blanchard debuted for Women Superstars Uncensored and was defeated by Niya in a match for the WSU Spirit Championship at Breaking Barriers III. On February 21, 2015, Blanchard picked up her first victory in WSU when she defeated Sassy Stephie.

Blanchard debuted for Shine Wrestling as a villain at the Shine 26 event on April 3, 2015, and was defeated by Evie. Later in the evening, Blanchard attacked Leva Bates, causing her and Jessicka Havok to be defeated by Saraya Knight and Su Yung, and later became the newest member of Valkyrie. At Shine 27, Blanchard was defeated by Bates. After the match, she and April Hunter both attacked Bates.

On January 9, 2016, Blanchard made her Lucha Underground debut losing to Ivelisse Velez in a dark match. On April 24, 2016, Blanchard wrestled in a tag team dark match alongside Prince Puma at a Lucha Underground taping defeating Marty Martinez and Mariposa.

Blanchard began wrestling intergender matches after the spring of 2016, after working for Shimmer, Stardom, and Lucha Underground, and NXT. She had a singles match against NXT signee Dominik Dijakovic and a mixed-tag team match with Ricochet, Bea Priestley, and Will Ospreay. On June 16, 2018, Blanchard defeated Mercedes Martinez to win the WSU Championship.

On July 7, Rise Wrestling had their Rise of the Knockouts cross-promotional event with Impact Wrestling. Blanchard won the Phoenix of Rise Championship, in a 30-minute Iron Woman match against Mercedes Martinez to win the previously vacated title. Blanchard lost the championship to Martinez on October 19, in a 75-minute iron woman match, the longest women's wrestling match in history. On July 14, Blanchard defeated Lacey Lane and Santana Garrett to win The Crash Women's Championship.

On September 1, Blanchard defeated Britt Baker, Chelsea Green, and Madison Rayne in a Four Corner Survival match at All In.

WWE (2016, 2017)
In 2016, Blanchard appeared in WWE, making her in-ring debut for NXT on April 2, 2016, in a match won by Alexa Bliss. On May 4, Blanchard wrestled and lost to Nia Jax. On June 15, Blanchard wrestled her third match, losing to Carmella. On July 13, 2017, Blanchard returned as part of the Mae Young Classic, and was eliminated from the tournament in the first round by Kairi Sane.

World Wonder Ring Stardom (2016–2017)
In August 2016, Blanchard made her Japanese debut for the World Wonder Ring Stardom promotion by entering the 2016 5-Star Grand Prix, where she made it to the finals, before losing to Yoko Bito on September 22. Blanchard returned to Stardom in April 2017. On April 30, she took part in the 2017 Cinderella Tournament, where she defeated High Speed Champion Kris Wolf in the first round, before being eliminated in the second round by eventual tournament winner Toni Storm. On May 14, Blanchard teamed with Jessicka Havok to unsuccessfully challenge Hiroyo Matsumoto and Jungle Kyona for the Goddess of Stardom Championship.

WOW-Women of Wrestling (2018–2022)

On September 5, 2018, it was announced that Blanchard had signed with Women of Wrestling (WOW), and would make her debut through the TV tapings from October 2018. On January 18, 2019, when WOW premiered on AXS TV, Blanchard made her televised debut, where she confronted the WOW World Champion Santana Garrett, establishing herself as the villain, as the two would feud over the championship. Blanchard won the championship for the first time on the February 15 episode of WOW by defeating previously undefeated Jungle Grrrl. On March 6, 2019, Blachard joined WOW owners Jeanie Buss and David McLane along with AXS TV CEO Andrew Simon to announce the network's second season renewal with a record number of 24 episodes. In addition, it was announced that Blanchard would be one of the trainers in the WOW all-women's wrestling training school in Long Beach, California. During her reign, Blanchard successfully defended her championship against Faith the Lioness, Reyna Reyes, Serpentine, and WOW's veteran, former champion, Jungle Grrrl. At the second-season finale, Blanchard lost her championship to The Beast, ending her reign at 217 days.

On October 6, 2021, on top of the Circa Resort & Casino in Las Vegas, ViacomCBS Global Distribution President Dan Cohen, alongside David McLane and WOW Executive Producers Jeanie Buss and AJ Mendez announced ViacomCBS had entered into a multi-year distribution agreement for WOW. For Blanchard this historic and exclusive media rights deal between CBS and WOW gives her career the biggest distribution platform in the history of women's professional wrestling. However, Blanchard had a falling out with the company and left before the new season began.

Impact Wrestling (2018–2020)

Knockouts Champion (2018–2019)
Blanchard made her debut for Impact Wrestling on Redemption, when she joined the commentary team during a match between Kiera Hogan and Taya Valkyrie. A few weeks later, after attacking her during her match, Blanchard defeated Hogan in her first match on Impact!. On Slammiversary XVI, Blanchard scored her first pay-per-view win, when she defeated Allie.

On August 12 (which aired on tape delay on August 30) at ReDefined special, Blanchard defeated Allie and Su Yung in a three-way match to win the Impact Knockouts Championship for the first time in her career. At One Night Only: Bad Intentions, which aired the following night, Blanchard made her first successful title defense, defeating Gisele Shaw. During her reign, Blanchard was able to retain her title against various competitors such as Su Yung, and Faby Apache. In October, Blanchard started a feud with Taya Valkyrie, whom she defeated on two different occasions — at Bound for Glory and three weeks later in a rematch at Impact. Valkyrie was then able to submit Blanchard in a mixed tag team match that earned her another title opportunity.

On January 6, 2019, at Impact Wrestling Homecoming, Blanchard lost the championship to Valkyrie, after special guest referee Gail Kim (whom she attacked during the match) performed Eat Defeat on Blanchard, ending her reign at 147 days. After she failed to regain the title from Valkyrie in a street fight, Blanchard started a feud with Kim that led to both women attacking each other on numerous occasions inside and outside the ring (including at Kim's husband's restaurant). This led to the announcement of a match between the two, at Impact Wrestling Rebellion on April 28, where Blanchard defeated Kim in what was officially Kim's last match. After the match, Kim praised Blanchard for her abilities and as the future of the division. Blanchard thanked Kim and returned her respect, turning her face in the process.

Impact World Champion (2019–2020)
On July 7, Blanchard competed against Sami Callihan in the first intergender match to ever headline a professional wrestling pay-per-view event at Slammiversary XVII, during which she was defeated. She later competed in a ladder match for the Impact X Division Championship, which was won by Ace Austin, on October 20 at Bound for Glory. On the November 19 episode of Impact!, Blanchard won a Gauntlet match against Daga, Moose, Rich Swann, Michael Elgin, and Brian Cage to become the No. 1 contender for the Impact World Championship. At the Hard to Kill pay-per-view on January 12, 2020, Blanchard defeated Callihan to win the Impact World Championship, becoming the first woman in history to win the title. Blanchard made only one successful
title defence against Taya Valkyrie who was the second woman to challenge for the world title also the first time to feature two women competing for the company's main championship. Her last match in Impact was taped on March 7, 2020, and aired on April 7, 2020, she teamed with Eddie Edwards for the Impact World Tag Team Championship against champions The North (Ethan Page and Josh Alexander) in a losing effort. After going on a leave of absence due to the COVID-19 pandemic, Blanchard departed Impact Wrestling on June 25 after her contract was terminated before it was set to expire on June 30; she was stripped of the Impact World Championship in the process.

Lucha Libre AAA Worldwide (2019)
On March 18, 2019, it was announced by Konnan that Blanchard had left The Crash Lucha Libre and joined AAA Lucha Libre. On May 18 in Tuxtla Gutiérrez, Chiapas, Blanchard made her debut in the AAA teaming with La Hiedra, who defeated Faby Apache and AAA Reina de Reinas Champion Lady Shani.

On August 3 at Triplemanía XXVII, Blanchard defeated Apache, Taya Valkyrie, Ayako Hamada, Chik Tormenta, La Hiedra, and Lady Shani in a Tables, Ladders, and Chairs match, to win the AAA Reina de Reinas Championship thus becoming the third foreigner (after Taya Valkyrie and Ayako Hamada) and first American to win the championship. However, Blanchard lost the title to Valkyrie in her first defense at the Impact Wrestling and AAA Lucha Invades NY event on September 15, ending her reign of 43 days.

Personal life
She was the stunt double for actress Florence Pugh in the film Fighting with My Family, produced by Dwayne "The Rock" Johnson, about former WWE wrestler Paige.

On November 20, 2019, Blanchard confirmed her engagement to fellow wrestler Miguel Olivo, better known by the ring name Daga. The couple married in August 2020 and resides in Mexico. In January 2023, the couple released a public statement announcing their separation.

In January 2020, multiple female wrestlers came forward with bullying and racism allegations against Blanchard, including an incident involving Blanchard spitting in a black woman's face and calling her a racial slur. The woman in question, Black Rose, later stated that the incident did indeed take place. Blanchard denied the allegations.

Championships and accomplishments
 American Pro Wrestling Alliance
 APWA World Ladies Championship (1 time)
 Canadian Wrestling Federation
 CWF Women's Championship (1 time)
 The Crash
 The Crash Women's Championship (1 time)
 East Coast Wrestling Association
 ECWA Women's Championship (1 time)
 ECWA Super 8 ChickFight Tournament (2014)
 Exodus Wrestling Alliance
 EWA Heavyweight Championship (1 time)
 EWA Florida Heavyweight Championship (1 time)
 Impact Wrestling
 Impact World Championship (1 time)
 Impact Knockouts Championship (1 time)
 Mashup Tournament (2019) – with Sami Callihan
 Impact Year End Awards (4 times)
 Knockout of the Year (2018)
 Move of the Year (2019) 
 Wrestler of the Year (2019)
 Match of the Year (2019) 
 Lucha Libre AAA Worldwide
 AAA Reina de Reinas Championship (1 time)
 Lucky Pro Wrestling
 Kings And Queens Tournament (2015) – with Anthony Greene
 PCW Ultra
 PCW Ultra Women's Championship (1 time)
 Pro Wrestling eXpress
 PWX Women's Championship (1 time)
 Pro Wrestling Illustrated
 Ranked No. 5 of the top of 100 female wrestlers in the PWI Women's 100 in 2019
 Ranked No. 83 of the top 500 singles wrestlers in the PWI 500 in 2020
 Remix Pro Wrestling
 Remix Pro Fury Championship (1 time)
 Rise Wrestling
 Phoenix Of RISE Championship (1 time)
 Rise Year End Awards (2 times)
 Match of the Year (2018) 
 Moment of The Year (2018) – 
 Shimmer Women Athletes
 Shimmer Tag Team Championship (1 time) – with Vanessa Kraven
 Sports Illustrated
 Ranked No. 2 of the top 10 women's wrestlers in 2019
 Warrior Wrestling
 WW Women's Championship (1 time)
 Women of Wrestling
 WOW World Championship (1 time)
 Women Superstars Uncensored
 WSU Championship (1 time)
 WrestleCircus
 WC Lady of the Ring Championship (1 time)
 WC Sideshow Championship (1 time)
 Zelo Pro
 Zelo Pro Women's Championship (1 time)

References

External links

 
 
 
 Women of Wrestling profile
 

1995 births
American female professional wrestlers
Living people
Professional wrestlers from North Carolina
Professional wrestling managers and valets
Sportspeople from Charlotte, North Carolina
TNA World Heavyweight/Impact World Champions
21st-century professional wrestlers
AAA Reina de Reinas Champions
TNA/Impact Knockouts World Champions
Shimmer Tag Team Champions